Slugovo ( or  or ) is a small settlement in the hills east of Begunje in the Municipality of Cerknica in the Inner Carniola region of Slovenia.

References

External links
Slugovo on Geopedia

Populated places in the Municipality of Cerknica